Tautomycin is a chemical that occurs naturally in shellfish and is produced by the bacterium Streptomyces spiroverticillatus. It is a polyketide-based structure characterized by a three hydroxyl groups, two ketones, a dialkylmaleic anhydride, an ester linkage (connecting anhydride unit to polyketide chain), a spiroketal and one methyl ether among others.

Pharmacology
It is a very potent inhibitor of the protein phosphatases PP1 and PP2A. Tautomycin demonstrates a slight preference for PP1 inhibition relative to PP2A inhibition.  Tautomycin is closely related to another anhydride containing polyketide PP inhibitor called tautomycetin which, in addition to being useful as a lead for cancer drug discovery, also is a very potent immunosuppressor.  The mechanism of immunosuppression by Tautomycetin differs from that of more classical immunosuppressors such as rapamycin and tacrolimus.

References

Phosphatase inhibitors
Polyketides
Spiro compounds